Anabel Ford (born 22 December 1951) is an American archaeologist specializing in the study of Mesoamerica, with a focus on the lowland Maya of Belize and Guatemala. She is recognized for her discovery of the ancient Maya city El Pilar. Ford is currently affiliated with the Institute of Social Behavioral and Economic Research (ISBER) and is the director of the MesoAmerican Research Center (MARC) at the University of California, Santa Barbara.

Early life
Ford was born the oldest of three children, all of whom were born in Los Angeles. Her father, Joseph B. Ford, was a professor of Sociology at California State University, Northridge and spoke German, Italian, French, Spanish, and Japanese and could read and write in Latin. Anabel Ford's mother, actress Marjorie Henshaw, was also known by her stage name Anabel Shaw.
Ford's interest in Mesoamerican prehistory—Teotihuacan, Monte Albán, Chichen Itza—led her to choose a research career around the jungles that enveloped Maya sites. 
In 1981, Ford received her PhD at the University of California, Santa Barbara based on a settlement survey of the transect (La Brecha Anabel) she established between Tikal and Yaxha in the Peten of Guatemala. She began her research career as a research scientist at UCSB.  In 1986 Ford became the director of the Mesoamerican Research Center.

Work
Ford began her work in the Maya lowlands in 1972. In 1978 while working on her doctorate, Ford mapped a transect between the Maya cities of Tikal and Yaxhá in the Petén of northern Guatemala.

In 1983, Ford initiated the Belize River Archaeological Settlement Survey, or BRASS, project in order to better examine the settlement patterns and cultural ecology of the Maya region. In the course of that survey she and her team discovered the ancient Maya city, El Pilar. In the following years the BRASS team excavated many sites from under the forest canopy. From 1983 to 1989, Ford and her team focused on the residential settlement patterns of the El Pilar area. From 1990 to 1992, Ford and her team focused on the full-scale excavation of representative residential of the El Pilar area. Investigations that began in 1993 at El Pilar resulted in detailed maps and site chronology for the monuments. Now that El Pilar is protected in Belize and Guatemala, and destined to be a peace park, current field research is focused on mapping the residential component of El Pilar, identifying undiscovered sites and monuments. The team has worked with Lidar since 2013, field protocol funded by National Geographic, which led to the discovery of The Citadel, a hilltop temple complex.

While Ford's work was focused on the landscape of the Maya region, she developed an increasing understanding of local knowledge and practices. She developed a conservation strategy called Archaeology Under the Canopy. This strategy promotes forest conservation in order to preserve cultural heritage. The forest surrounding El Pilar serves as protection for the monuments and artifacts created by the ancient city's residents. Therefore, conserving the forest ultimately protects the region's cultural heritage. Her efforts helped set aside nearly 2,000 Ha in the El Pilar area.

Ford's work at El Pilar and with master Maya Forest gardeners is profiled in The Modern Maya Incidents of Travel and Friendship in Yucatan  (University of Texas Press 2012), a work on the living Maya by Macduff Everton. Everton's narrative breadth shows the importance of historical perspectives on Maya landscapes for the conservation and development of the Maya Forest. Ford's work converges with Everton's and they have collaborated in the field and with presentations and publications that demonstrate the value of traditional Maya knowledge. Ford also collaborates with Ronald Nigh, an ethnologist and ecological anthropologist working with traditional Maya farmers. Their book, The Maya Forest Garden: Eight Millennia of Sustainable Cultivation of the Tropical Woodlands, examines both contemporary tropical farming techniques and the archaeological record to make the argument that these ancient techniques, still in use today, can support significant populations over long periods of time. They argue that traditional Maya practices serve as solutions to contemporary problems, such as sustainability, climate change, and natural resource scarcity.

Ford is president of Exploring Solutions Past: the Maya Forest Alliance, which is a nonprofit organization promoting the global significance of the Maya culture. Ford suggests that traditional Maya practices potentially serve as solutions to contemporary problems, such as climate change and natural resource scarcity. Exploring Solutions Past: Maya Forest Alliance teams up with the Maya farmers of El Pilar Forest Garden Network in order to support sustainable agriculture in the region.

In 2000, she was an Associate Laureate for Cultural Heritage sponsored by the Rolex Awards for Enterprise.

In addition to her archaeological work in the El Pilar region, Ford, as of 2013, is a board member of the Duke of Edinburgh Awards.

Notable publications

References

External links

1951 births
American archaeologists
University of California, Santa Barbara alumni
American Mesoamericanists
Women Mesoamericanists
Mesoamerican archaeologists
Mayanists
20th-century Mesoamericanists
Living people
American women archaeologists
20th-century American women scientists
21st-century American women scientists
20th-century American women writers
21st-century American women writers